Edward Butler was an American baseball shortstop in the Negro leagues. He played with the Newark Eagles in 1943 and the Homestead Grays in 1945.

References

External links
 and Seamheads

Homestead Grays players
Newark Eagles players
Year of birth missing
Year of death missing
Baseball shortstops